Melanda: Land of Mystery is a role-playing game published by Wilmark Dynasty in 1980.

Description
Melanda is a fantasy role-playing system. The game includes rules for character creation, combat, and magic, with descriptions of monsters, equipment, six character races, and the world of Melanda. Ability scores are determined by what skills the character studies as a youth. In the game's rune-carving magic system, a character learns various magic runes that modify and act on each other to create varying effects.

Publication history
Melanda: Land of Mystery was designed by John M. Corradin and Lee C. McCormick and published by Wilmark Dynasty in 1980 as 56 loose-leaf pages, an outer folder, and two dice. The second edition was published in 1981 as a 64-page book.

Reception
Lawrence Schick called this game "several years ahead of its time", the combat system "quite original" and the magic system "Perhaps the most innovative".

Reviews
Different Worlds (Issue 16 - Nov 1981)

References

Fantasy role-playing games
Role-playing games introduced in 1980